Judith Ann "Judy" Howe (later Hult, born June 25, 1935) is a retired American artistic gymnast. She competed at the 1956 Summer Olympics with the best individual result of 52nd place on the balance beam and uneven bars. In 1976 she was inducted into the Beaver County Sports Hall of Fame.

References

1935 births
Living people
Gymnasts at the 1956 Summer Olympics
Olympic gymnasts of the United States
American female artistic gymnasts
20th-century American women